Townsville Correctional Centre is an Australian prison facility in Stuart, Townsville, Queensland, Australia. The facility has been known in the past as "Her Majesty's Penal Establishment Stewart's Creek", "H.M. Prison Townsville", "Stuart Prison", and now known as "Townsville Correctional Centre".

It was the only correctional centre in Queensland to hold mainstream males, females and protection prisoners all within the same secure perimeter. It remains the most diverse correctional facility within Queensland accommodating high secure male, high secure female, high secure male protection, low open male custody and low open female custody operations.

A new female facility began construction in June 2006 in a complex adjacent to the male section with its own secure perimeter. Female inmates were finally moved over to the new centre in December 2008.

Inaugural superintendent – Mr. James Ryan was appointed on 6 April 1893, having been promoted from his former position as the superintendent of the "old" Townsville Gaol, which was located at the site of the current Townsville Central State School on Warburton street in North Ward.

Stewart's Creek Penal Establishment marked 120 years of operational service to the Queensland Community in 2013. Since the closure of Boggo Road Gaol in 1992, Townsville Correctional Centre is the longest continually operating Prison in Queensland. On 6 April 2015 it reached another milestone, the 125th anniversary of its establishment (6 April 1890) i.e. the date on which the building contractor Mr. Thomas Matthews accepted and signed the contract to construct the penal establishment, within two years. Work began on the "Her Majesty's Penal Establishment Stewart's Creek" on 9 June 1890.

See also

 List of Australian Prisons

References

 http://www.aic.gov.au/research/corrections/facilities/qld.html#townsville
 http://www.dcs.qld.gov.au/About_Us/The_Department/Custodial_Corrections/Townsville_Correctional_Centre/index.shtml

Prisons in Queensland
Buildings and structures in Townsville
Stuart, Queensland